The Free Democrats may refer to:

The Free Democrats (Denmark) (defunct)
The Free Democrats (Denmark) (current)

See also
Free Democrats (disambiguation)